Fonua Pole (born 2 June 2002) is a professional rugby league footballer who plays as a  for the Wests Tigers in the NRL.

Background
Pole was born in Wellington, New Zealand, and raised in Victoria. He was educated at Mount Ridley College, Craigieburn playing Australian rules football in his youth before his mum encouraged him to play his junior rugby league for the Sunbury Tigers. He said, "It started to become a bit of an issue because mum didn’t like that in AFL most of the games and trainings were on Sundays, when she always wanted us to go to church."

Graduating through the Victorian Thunderbolts system, he was spotted by Wests Tigers playing for a Combined Affiliated States side at the Australian Schoolboys Championships.

Career

2022
Pole made his first grade debut for the Wests Tigers against the New Zealand Warriors in round 16, becoming Wests Tigers player no. 257. It was the Warriors' first home game in nearly 2 years due to the COVID-19 pandemic, in front of a sold-out crowd. Pole said, "“It was 100 percent Warriors crowd just screaming at us, I think I got slandered on the sideline a bit and someone was yelling at me that they felt sorry for me and didn’t want me to go on."

The next week, he was named in the starting team after a late withdrawal from James Tamou, and ran for a game-best 167 metres and made 17 tackles without a miss. He then remained in first grade for the remainder of the season, and was named the club's Rookie of the Year.

References

External links
Tigers profile

2002 births
Living people
New Zealand rugby league players
New Zealand sportspeople of Tongan descent
New Zealand people of Niuean descent
Rugby league players from Wellington City
Rugby league props
Wests Tigers players